Timeball is a puzzle video game released by NEC for the TurboGrafx-16. The object of the game is to guide a ball along pieces of track by moving tiles like a sliding puzzle. The game's name in Japan is Blodia, an anagram of Diablo, the title of a computer game upon which Blodia is based. Versions of Blodia were released exclusively in Japan for the original Game Boy and the Sharp X68000. A spin-off titled Blodia Land: Puzzle Quest was released for the Famicom, replacing the ball with cartoon dinosaur-like characters. These versions were developed by Tonkin House and published by Broderbund.

Gameplay

The grid on screen is composed of tiles. Some tiles have a piece of road, and a black tile represents "the void", an area where one can drag the tile nearby in order to complete a road which will be taken by a ball that will follow the path. Players must arrange the tiles such that the ball traverses all sections of track. The ball can be sped up by pressing a button. If the ball reaches a tile without a piece of track, it falls out of play.

The game also includes a level editor which allows for the creation of custom puzzles.
An earlier "prototype" version without the level editor was published for the TI-99/4a and other computers as "Diablo" in 1985.

See also 
Loco-Motion

References

External links

1990 video games
Game Boy games
Puzzle video games
X68000 games
TurboGrafx-16 games
Multiplayer and single-player video games
Video games developed in Japan